Sasidharan known as Sasi is an Indian Film Director, Screenwriter, working primarily in Tamil Cinema based in Chennai. He made his directorial debut with Sollamale in 1998, followed by a series of successful romantic films like Roja Kootam (2002), Dishyum (2006), Poo (2008). His first action film was Ainthu Ainthu Ainthu (2013), followed by Pichaikkaran (2016), Sivappu Manjal Pachai (2019)

Career
He made his directorial debut with Sollamale in 1998 and the Telugu movie Seenu (1999). It was followed with a series of successful romance films Roja Kootam (2002) and Dishyum (2006). In January 2007, he decided to make Poo (2008), after being inspired by the romantic short story of Veyilodu Poi written by Thamizh Selvan, noting that the effect that the story had on him was "Mind-blowing" and decided that he had "to take the story to everyone". He chose to utilise a new technical team for the project, choosing to sign up S. S. Kumar and P. G. Muthiah for the music and cinematography respectively, with the pair both passing a selection interview set up by Sasi. Srikanth was retained while Malayalam actress Parvathy was selected to play the female lead role in the film, and the director worked on toning down the actress' complexion. Upon release in December 2008, the film gained positive reviews with a critical noting "the one man who deserves an ovation here is director Sasi", "handling the story, screenplay, dialogue and direction, he has given a product that will please all true lovers of cinema and he must also be credited with extracting moving performances from the cast." A reviewer from Rediff.com wrote "as far as screenplays and performances go, Sasi has a winner on his hands. Few rural sagas are this refreshing or poetic." The film subsequently won accolades at several regional award ceremonies such as the 56th Filmfare Awards South, Vijay Awards and the Tamil Nadu State Film Awards, where it won recognition including a special mention in the Best Film category as another for portraying women in good light. The film was also screened across international film festivals, notably at the Los Angeles Indian Film Festival, and won Sasi the Best Director award in Ahmedabad Film Festival.

Sasi began work on his next, his first action entertainer, in late 2008 and worked on the script of the film, initially titled Puyal for almost two years. The director had casually narrated the story to Bharath and the actor, impressed with the narration, approached the producers of the film to cast him in the lead role and Sasi obliged. Since 2010, the actor has expressed how important the film will be to his career and worked out to sport a six pack in the film. The film titled Ainthu Ainthu Ainthu (555), which also features Bharath, Chandini and Erica Fernandes, eventually released after several delays in August 2013 and won critical acclaim. A critic from Behindwoods.com noted "Sasi is a master teller when it comes to narrate a story about love and its finer aspects and there would always be a kind of poignancy in them. 555 is no exception", while another critic noted "The non-linear screenplay is a huge plus in making the film interesting". The film Pichaikkaran (2016) report say will be produces by Vijay Antony himself and will also compose the music sources. Pichaikkaran movie shooting going on several places in chennai. Apparently, it was Sasi's who used Vijay Antony as a Music director in his film Dishyum.

After the much loved, blockbuster hit  Pichaikkaran, Sasi returns with Sivappu Manjal Pachai (2019). Sasi sticks to his strengths and delivers a wholesome family entertainer which is bolstered by sentiments, some good moments and dialogues revolving around the lead characters. Siddharth plays a stern traffic cop while G. V. Prakash Kumar plays a brash and young street illegal bike racer.

Filmography

References

External links

Tamil film directors
Living people
People from Salem district
Tamil screenwriters
Film directors from Tamil Nadu
Screenwriters from Tamil Nadu
21st-century Indian film directors
21st-century Indian dramatists and playwrights
21st-century Indian screenwriters
1970 births